Tam Kan (18 December 1917 - 10 June 2001) was born in Xinhui, a city district in the city of Jiangmen in the province of Guangdong in southern China.  He is the second son of Tam See Chow's second marriage to Wun Li King.  Although Tam See Chow was a rich and high-ranking official, Tam Kan went through hardship since the age of three when his father died.  He learnt carpentry and worked to support his mother, and went through the hardship of surviving WW2.   He was one of many workers that participated in the construction of many building structures in Guangzhou including Haizhu Bridge, National Sun Yat-sen University Library, and Guangzhou Baiyun International Airport.  He later went to Hong Kong and worked for the Asiatic Petroleum Company and the British North Borneo Company and in 1951 was one of the early batch of workers selected for transfer from China to North Borneo (now called Sabah).(1)

During the 50s, Tam Kan worked as a foreman of the British North Borneo Company, contributed and witnessed the early development of North Borneo.  He oversaw many constructions of the early buildings and landmarks of which many still exists in today's Sabah, such as the Standard Chartered Bank building (opposite Suria Sabah) and The Hong Kong and Shanghai Banking Corporation (HSBC) building.  He established his own company 'Tam Kan Contractors Company' in 1958 in Kota Kinabalu, previously known as Jesselton before independence.

After North Borneo attained self-government on 31 August 1963, Tam Kan became one of the first to establish a foothold in the booming construction industry and the company went on to build many iconic buildings in the state of Sabah, such as Sacred Heart Cathedral, Kota Kinabalu; Segaliud Bridge; Teachers' Training College; 100 Police Flats in Kepayan; Police Flats in Tanjung Aru, shop houses and many more. Although many still exist today,  some have either been demolished or are going to be demolished such as ‘Tam Kan Flats’ as reported recently in 2015 by Malaysian media. (2)(3)(4)(5)

Tam Kan also constructed, owned and operated the Winner Hotel, one of only two tallest buildings in Kota Kinabalu in the 60s.  His residence at 5 1/2 mile Tuaran Road was a unique building designed by himself in the 60s and is believed to be the first private residential address with a full sized water fountain.
 

Tam Kan was also the founding President of the West Coast Sze Yi Association where he initiated the funding and construction of the eight-storey Sze Yi building in Bundusan Commercial Centre in Kota Kinabalu.  He was president from 1986-1989 and an honorary president.  The Association established an education loan scheme for the good of members' children in 2015, continuing Tam Kan's belief that all children should receive an education. (6)

His many contributions to Sabah, Malaysia, formally known as North Borneo was recognized by the Head of State and he was conferred the titles 'BSK' and 'ASDK' in the 70s and 80s respectively for outstanding services for Sabah Malaysia (see Wikipedia under Orders, decorations, and medals of Malaysia for more info).

Tam Kan was a philanthropist who worked tirelessly to help the less fortunate.  He was particularly keen in promoting education and sponsoring children in attaining formal education, both locally and overseas, as he himself was deprived of an education.  He had donated generously to the running and building of schools and libraries in Malaysia and in China.

Tam Kan had never forgotten his roots, and was actively involved and contributed in the development of Xinhui.  He was given a special award for the contribution and promotion of city by the Xinhui City Government and is in the list of outstanding overseas Chinese originated from the city. (7)(8)(9)

Tam Kan died on 10 June 2001 in Kota Kinabalu, Malaysia at the age of 84 having suffered from ill health for a number of years.

Tam Kan married Lam Chee (26 April 1922 - 24 January 2012) on 28 October 1942 and has four sons and three daughters.

Tam Kan Contractors Company is no longer active in the Malaysian construction industry.

Sources/Links 

 Chinese Government webpages on The History of Overseas Xinhui Chinese: http://www.gd-info.gov.cn/books/dtree/showSJBookContent.jsp?bookId=16916&partId=98&artId=81424
 Malaysian Chinese Association (Link: http://www.mca.org.my/en/tam-kan-flats-in-inanam-to-be-demolished/) 
 The Borneo Post (Link: https://www.propertyhunter.com.my/news.php?id=1577),
 New Sabah Times (Link:  http://www.newsabahtimes.com.my/nstweb/fullstory/87229),
 Kinabalu Today (Link: http://www.kinabalutoday.com/index.php/home-2/local-news/7490-sell-off-abandoned-tam-kan-flats-rather-than-rebuilding-it-suggests-lawmaker)
 Daily Express (Malaysia) online newspaper of East Malaysia published on 6 July 2015.  Link=http://www.dailyexpress.com.my/news.cfm?NewsID=101248)
 Chinese Government webpages on The History of Overseas Xinhui Chinese : http://www.gd-info.gov.cn/books/dtree/showSJBookContent.jsp?bookId=16916&partId=129&artId=81424  
 Chinese Government webpages on The History of Overseas Xinhui Chinese: http://www.gd-info.gov.cn/books/dtree/showSJBookContent.jsp?bookId=16916&partId=124&artId=81424  
 Chinese Government webpages on The History of Overseas Xinhui Chinese : http://www.gd-info.gov.cn/books/dtree/showSJBookContent.jsp?bookId=16916&partId=98&artId=81424

20th-century Malaysian businesspeople
People from Xinhui District
Chinese emigrants to Malaysia
1917 births
2001 deaths